, also known as Ruin Explorers Fam & Ihrie, is a four episode 1995 OVA by ANIMATE and Asia-Do. It is set in a fantasy environment and stars Fam and Ihrie, two female treasure hunters working to find the "Ultimate Power".

Characters

A sorceress and swordfighter who acts a bit like a tomboy. She was once cursed as a child, when she was the apprentice to an unlenient magician, which causes her to transform into a mouse any time she uses magic. As such, her prime motives for acquiring the Ultimate Power are 1) to lift her curse, 2) to get revenge on her old master, and 3) to conquer the world.

An immature, air-headed and optimistic girl with pointy elf-like ears, fangs, and a cat-like tail, making her resemble a catgirl. She is a Wiccan sorceress who calls on the spirits of nature to perform magic. Fam is unwilling to use her magic for destructive means because the spirits disapprove of such uses and as such might not “talk” to her any longer. This would result in her losing her magic abilities.

The prince of a lost kingdom, set out for revenge against Ruguduroll.

Another female treasure hunter, coupled with Miguel and rivaling Fam and Ihrie. She is a sorceress, but does not share the weaknesses of a curse nor fear of animosity with the spirits. However, she does have a strong fear of mice, which can be especially crippling after Ihrie has been transformed by her curse.

A powerful swordsman and treasure hunter, accompanying Rasha. He is vain and boastful, claiming that nobody has ever cut him, and that he has defeated fifty cavalry men at once.

A selfish merchant who constantly deceives the other characters in order to obtain treasure or money, always followed by his dog, Gil. He is also a coward, and only comes with the rest of the group because he either sees something in it for him, or does not want to be left alone in dangerous areas. However, he is highly knowledgeable and thus rather valued by the explorers as a source of information.

The main antagonist, a powerful magician that ruined Lyle's kingdom and is out to obtain the Ultimate Power.

Episodes 
The opening theme is "Magical Beat!" by Rica Matsumoto. For Episode 4, the ending theme is "Magical Beat!" by Rica Matsumoto.

References

External links
 

1992 manga
1995 anime OVAs
Action anime and manga
Fantasy anime and manga
Maiden Japan
Hobby Japan manga